Windsor International Transit Terminal is a bus terminal for Transit Windsor. It is located on the block between Chatham Street and Pitt Street on the east side of Church Street in downtown Windsor, Ontario, Canada.

Transit Windsor redeveloped its downtown transit terminal through a public-private partnership involving federal, provincial and local governments and Greyhound Canada. The new bus station, built at a cost of $7.4-million, opened in the summer of 2007, replacing a small facility that was more than 65 years old. The project is sited next to several major arts facilities, like the Art Gallery of Windsor, Windsor's Community Museum, and François Baby House, and is about 0.6 kilometres from Caesars Windsor.

Services
Transit Windsor routes serving this terminal: 
 1A Transway 
 1C Transway(eastbound and westbound) 
 3 West(evenings, Sundays & holidays) 
 4 Ottawa 
 5 Dominion 
 6 Dougall 
 8 Walkerville 
 14 Parent 
 Tunnel Bus
 Special events buses to Detroit

References

External links

Pictures, videos and a review of the Windsor International Transit Terminal

Bus stations in Ontario
Transport in Windsor, Ontario
Buildings and structures in Windsor, Ontario
Transport infrastructure completed in 2007
2007 establishments in Ontario